Nicholas Merry (born Woodstock, Oxfordshire, England) is a British businessman who made his money in the United States running a now defunct Florida-based dental biotechnology company called MicroDenteX as well as investment in gemstones in Guinea.

Until 2 October 2008, Nick Merry was chairman of Oxford United Football Club, the club he has supported all his life. He played youth football for the club in the 1970s before a knee injury ended his career prematurely. He also played football for England at schoolboy level.

Merry was part of Woodstock Partners Limited (or WPL), a consortium  headed up by Ian Lenagan that bought the club for £1 from former chairman Firoz Kassam.

Notes

References
Nick Merry Flown from the Nest

Living people
English football chairmen and investors
Year of birth missing (living people)
English footballers
Association footballers not categorized by position
Oxford United F.C. players
England schools international footballers
People from Woodstock, Oxfordshire
Oxford United F.C. chairmen and investors